Ulf Forseth Indgaard (born 1989) is a Norwegian orienteering competitor who has received two medals at the Junior World Orienteering Championships.

He received a silver medal in the middle distance (behind Johan Runesson), and a bronze medal in the relay at the 2008 Junior World Orienteering Championships in Gothenburg.

He competed for Norway at the 2012 World Orienteering Championships. In the sprint competition he qualified for the final, where he placed 29th.

Ulf grew up just outside Levanger in Norway, on a farm called Flatåsen, with his parents, and two siblings. He runs for the orienteering club Frol IL, and his little brother Jo, is also a talentful orienteering runner.

References

External links

1989 births
Living people
People from Levanger
Norwegian orienteers
Male orienteers
Foot orienteers
Sportspeople from Trøndelag
20th-century Norwegian people
21st-century Norwegian people
Junior World Orienteering Championships medalists